Ulva californica is a species of seaweed, a green alga in the family Ulvaceae, the sea lettuces. This species is found from Alaska to California.

References

Ulvaceae
Plants described in 1899
Flora of North America